The St. Boniface Catholic Church Complex in Menominee, Nebraska, includes six contributing buildings and a cemetery on a  area.

It was listed on the National Register of Historic Places in 1983.  The listing included six contributing buildings (including the church, a rectory, and a school) and a contributing site (a cemetery).

The church is Gothic Revival and was built using chalk rock in 1886 and 1900–1902.  The rectory is brick and was built in 1911.  The -story chalk rock school was built in 1923 in the Second Renaissance Revival style.

References

External links
More photos of St. Boniface Catholic Church Complex at Wikimedia Commons

Churches on the National Register of Historic Places in Nebraska
Gothic Revival architecture in Nebraska
Churches completed in 1886
Churches completed in 1911
Buildings and structures completed in 1923
Buildings and structures in Cedar County, Nebraska
Roman Catholic churches in Nebraska
Clergy houses